Mohammadabad-e Chahak (also Romanized as Moḩammadābād-e Chāhaḵ; also known as Moḩammadābād and Muhammadābād) is a village in Paskuh Rural District, Sedeh District, Qaen County, South Khorasan Province, Iran. At the 2006 census, its population was 519, in 131 families.

References 

Populated places in Qaen County